Huayo may refer to:
 Huayo District, one of thirteen districts of the province Pataz in Peru
 Azúcar huayo, trees in the genus Hymenaea
 Botón huayo (Anthodiscus pilosus), a plant species found in Peru
 Leche huayo (Couma macrocarpa), a plant native to South America